The president of the Somali Region in Ethiopia is the head of the executive branch of the region. The current president is Mustafa Mohammed Omar, who has also been the vice chairman of the Somali Democratic Party (SDP), elected in 22 August 2018.

List of presidents of the Somali Region

References

Further reading 
 Abdi Ismail Samatar (2004): "Ethiopian Federalism: Autonomy versus Control in the Somali Region". Third World Quarterly, Vol. 25/6
 John Markakis (1996): "The Somali in Ethiopia". Review of African Political Economy, Vol. 23, No. 70, pp. 567–570
 John Markakis (1994): "Briefing: Somalia in the New Political Order of Ethiopia". Review of African Political Economy, Vol. 21, No. 59 pp. 71–79
Somali Region